Harry John Robert Williams (born 17 January 1996) is an English footballer who plays for Swindon Supermarine as a forward.

Career

Cheltenham Town
Williams was born in Cheltenham, Gloucestershire, and began a scholarship with Cheltenham Town in July 2012. Williams previously was at Southside before being scouted at eight. Despite this, Williams remained at the club until he went on a six weeks trial with Cheltenham Town, which ultimately led him joining the club.

He is a product of the Cheltenham Town youth system, starting at the Academy in the Under 9's, making his first-team debut at the age of 17, on 22 October 2013, as a late substitute as Cheltenham beat Morecambe 3–0 in League Two. As a result of making his first team breakthrough at Cheltenham Town, Williams went on to win the club's Young Player of the Year and was honoured by the League Football Education. Additionally, Williams was nominated for Young Sports Personality of the year at the Gloucestershire Media Sports.

Following this reward Williams continued the second year of his scholarship, scoring a Cheltenham Town youth record 38 goals. Added to this he scored in every round of the FA Youth cup that the club participated in. This resulted in him being offered his first professional deal, signing two-year contract on 1 July 2014. After making eight more appearances in the 2014–15 season, Williams signed a contract extension with the club, keeping him until 2016.

On 9 December 2015 it was announced that Williams' contract will not be renewed at the end of the season.

Loan Spells from Cheltenham Town

In December 2013, Williams was loaned out to Conference South side Farnborough and made one appearance before returning to his parent club.

On 5 September 2014, Williams joined Evesham United on a one-month loan. The next day, Williams scored on his Evesham United debut, in a 1–1 draw against Wimborne Town. Williams then made his first start for Evesham United in the following game that saw them lose 3–1 against Didcot Town. After extending his loan for the second and third time, Williams went on to make eleven appearances for the club and scored five times before recalled by his parent club on 17 November 2014.

After his loan spell at Evesham United came to an end, Williams once again loaned out when he joined Gloucester City on 12 March 2015 for a one-month loan. Three days later, on 15 March 2015, Williams made his Gloucester City debut, making his first start, in a 1–0 loss against Boston United. Williams then scored his first Gloucester City goal, in a 3–1 win over Leamington on 5 April 2015. Williams soon extended his loan spell with the club until the end of the season and scored three times in seven appearances before being recalled in mid-April.

Prior to the 2015/16 campaign Williams, along with another Cheltenham Town youngster Bobbie Dale, joined Isthmian League Premier Division club Farnborough on loan until January. Williams went on to make ten appearances and scoring ten times, including scoring a hat-trick against Three Bridges on 21 October 2015. However, Williams was recalled by his parent club in late=October.

Shortly after ending his loan spell at Farnborough, Williams re-joined Gloucester City for the second time on 12 November 2015. Williams then re-debuted for the club on 14 November 2015, in a 1–0 loss against Lowestoft Town. Williams eventually scored four times in nine appearances before returning to his parent club on loan.

Sacramento Republic

After leaving Cheltenham Town, Williams moved to United States, signing for United Soccer League club Sacramento Republic in February 2016 where he reunited with former Cheltenham Town manager Paul Buckle.

After picking up a minor knee injury in pre-season, Williams eventually made his Sacramento Republic USL debut on 12 June 2016, in a 2–1 win over Real Monarchs. Williams then scored his first Sacramento Republic goal on 7 May 2016, in a 2–0 win against LA Galaxy II. Williams scored 4 goals during the regular season (a team high for a player of U23 age), with the 3rd goal being the winning goal versus Orange County Blues, a 2–1 win which secured a place in the playoffs for Sacramento Republic.

Return to Non-League
He rejoined Gloucester City in February 2018 on non-contract terms until the end of the 2017/2018 season. In February 2019, he signed for Southern Football League Premier Division South side Swindon Supermarine. In October 2021, he was loaned out to Southern League Division One South side Cirencester Town.

Career statistics

Personal life
While playing in the America, Williams shared his apartment with teammate, Mackenzie Pridham.

Growing up in Charlton Kings, Cheltenham, England, Williams began playing football at age five and attended Glenfall Primary School and Balcarras School. While playing in America, Williams was nicknamed "Hack-A-Harry".

References

External links
 
 
 Profile at Aylesbury United

Living people
1996 births
Sportspeople from Cheltenham
Footballers from Gloucestershire
English footballers
Association football forwards
Cheltenham Town F.C. players
Bishop's Cleeve F.C. players
Farnborough F.C. players
Evesham United F.C. players
Gloucester City A.F.C. players
Sacramento Republic FC players
Swindon Supermarine F.C. players
Cirencester Town F.C. players
English Football League players
National League (English football) players
Southern Football League players
Isthmian League players
USL Championship players
English expatriate footballers
Expatriate soccer players in the United States
English expatriate sportspeople in the United States